The Akwa Ibom State Ministry of Justice is the Nigerian state government ministry, concerned with the administration of justice. The Ministry is under the coordination of the Attorney-General and Commissioner for Justice, who is often assisted by the Solicitor-General and Permanent Secretary.

See also 
Akwa Ibom State Ministry of Education

References 

Government ministries of Akwa Ibom State
Akwa Ibom